Brayen Pondaag (born 17 December 2001) is an Indonesian professional footballer who plays as a attacking midfielder for Liga 1 club Persebaya Surabaya.

Club career

Persebaya Surabaya
He was signed for Persebaya Surabaya and played in Liga 1 in 2022-2023 season. Pondaag made his league debut on 23 August 2022 in a match against PSIS Semarang at the Gelora Bung Tomo Stadium, Surabaya.

Career statistics

Club

Notes

Honours

Club 
Persmin Minahasa
 Liga 3 North Sulawesi: 2021

References

External links
 Brayen Pondaag at Soccerway
 Brayen Pondaag at Liga Indonesia

2001 births
Living people
People from Bitung
Sportspeople from North Sulawesi
Indonesian footballers
Persmin Minahasa players
Persebaya Surabaya players
Liga 1 (Indonesia) players
Association football midfielders